The 2015 FIM Superstock 1000 Cup was the seventeenth season of the FIM Superstock 1000 Cup, the eleventh held under this name. The championship, a support class to the Superbike World Championship at its European rounds, used 1000 cc motorcycles and was reserved for riders between 16 and 28 years of age. The 2015 season was contested over eight races at eight meetings, beginning at Motorland Aragón on 12 April and ending at Circuit de Nevers Magny-Cours on 4 October.

With an eighth-place finish in the final race of the year at Magny-Cours, Italy's Lorenzo Savadori – riding for the Nuova M2 Racing team – became the series champion, winning the first title in the class for Aprilia. Savadori won four of the eight races to be held in 2015, including three successive wins at Assen, Imola and Donington Park, and ultimately won the championship by twenty-two points ahead of BMW rider Roberto Tamburini, riding for Team MotoxRacing. Tamburini was a three-time race winner, winning at Motorland Aragón, Portimão and Jerez. Raffaele De Rosa completed the championship top-three, who took six podium finishes for Althea Racing. Fourth place in the championship went to the only other race-winner during the 2015 season, Frenchman Jérémy Guarnoni, who achieved a victory on home soil – at Magny-Cours – for Team Trasimeno.

In the manufacturers' championship, Savadori's four wins for Aprilia also aided the marque to the title, winning it at the final round as well. Aprilia finished 34 points clear of BMW, with Ducati a further 5 points behind.

Race calendar and results

Championship standings

Riders' championship

Manufacturers' championship

Entry list

All entries used Pirelli tyres.

References

External links

FIM Superstock 1000 Cup seasons
Superstock 1000 Cup
Superstock 1000 Cup